The Greater Kampala Light Rail is a modern light rail system under construction in Kampala, Uganda, and is being built by China.

Routes 
 Kampala-Namanve via Nakawa, Kinawataka, Banda, Kireka and Bweyogerere (12 km east);
 Kampala-Lubowa via Kibuye, Najjanankumbi and Zana (7 km);
 Kampala-Kyengera via Katwe, Kibuye, Ndeeba, Nalukolongo and Natete (7 km); and
 Kampala-Kawempe via City Square, Buganda Road, Wandegeya, Mulago, Kubbiri and Bwaise (9 km north).

Ultimately the lines will extend to the area of
 Entebbe 37 km southwest.
 Nsangi 20 km west.
 Wakiso 20 km .
 and other surrounding towns.

Total route-km is 35 km in phase 1; ultimate length 240 km.

Specifications 
 Track gauge, Standard Gauge (1.435 m)
 Number of tracks, two (double line)
 Gradient, 5% (maximum)
 Curvature, 30 m radius (minimum)
 Traction, electric 750 V DC overhead
 Right-of-way width, 9–15 m
 Design life, 60 years 
 Speed, 80 km/h (maximum)
 Train set length, 30 m
 Inter-station distance, 0.5 - 2.0 km

References 

Light rail
Transport in Kampala